Bermellar is a village and municipality in the province of Salamanca,  Spain.

It predates Celtic times.

References

External links
Bermellar online

Municipalities in the Province of Salamanca